Isocossus is a genus of moths in the family Cossidae.

Species
 Isocossus cruciatus (Holloway, 1986)
 Isocossus retak (Holloway, 1986)
 Isocossus rufipecten (Holloway, 1986)
 Isocossus seria (Holloway, 1986)
 Isocossus stroehli Yakovlev, 2006
 Isocossus telisai (Holloway, 1986)
 Isocossus vandeldeni Roepke, 1957
 Isocossus zolotuhini Yakovlev, 2015

References

  1990. A Phylogenetic study on Cossidae (Lepidoptera: Ditrysia) based on external adult morphology. Zoologische Verhandelingen 263: 1–295. Full article: .
  2006. New Cossidae (Lepidoptera) from Asia, Africa and Macronesia. Tinea 19 (3): 188–213. Full article: .
  2015. A new species of Isocossus Roepke, 1957 (Lepidoptera: Cossidae) from Vietnam, including a world catalogue of the genus. Zootaxa 3990 (1):  141–146. Preview: .

External links

Natural History Museum Lepidoptera generic names catalog

Cossinae
Moth genera